In the 2020–21 season, Podbeskidzie Bielsko-Biała competed in Ekstraklasa. In addition, they competed in the season's Polish Cup edition, where they were eliminated by Zagłębie Lubin, following the 2–4 defeat in the round of 32.

Players

Competitions

Ekstraklasa

Standings

Matches

Polish Cup

References

Podbeskidzie Bielsko-Biała
Podbeskidzie Bielsko-Biała